Collopy is a surname. The name originated from the word "collop" meaning a fully grown horse or cow. Notable people with the surname include:

Cullen Collopy (born 1993), South African rugby union player
Daniel Collopy (born 1978), Australian actor
Will Collopy (1897–1972), Australian rules footballer

References